The Sanremo Music Festival 2004 was the 54th annual Sanremo Music Festival, held at the Teatro Ariston in Sanremo, province of Imperia, between 2 and 6 March 2004 and broadcast by Rai 1.

The show was presented by Simona Ventura, supported by Paola Cortellesi and Gene Gnocchi. Composer  Tony Renis  served as the artistic director.

For the first time since 1984, in this edition there is not a division of the singers in two sections (Big Artists and Newcomers) but a single competition.

As was the case in 1975, due to disagreements between the organizer of the festival Tony Renis and the major record companies, the latter boycotted the festival not inserting their prominent names in the competition.

The winner of the competition was Marco Masini with the song "L'uomo volante". Mario Venuti won the critics prize with the song "Crudele".
 
In addition to musical guests, the guests of this edition also included Dustin Hoffman, Cirque du Soleil, Stefania Sandrelli, Rupert Everett, Raoul Bova, Roberto Bolle.

After every night, Bruno Vespa and Alba Parietti hosted a special edition of the talk show Porta a Porta with the participation of singers and journalists.

Participants and results

Musical guests

References 

Sanremo Music Festival by year
2004 in Italian music
2004 music festivals
2004 in Italian television